Gotham City is a fictional city in DC Comics.

Gotham City may also refer to:
 Gotham City (album)
 "Gotham City" (song)
 Gotham City (theme parks)
 Operation Gotham City, a criminal investigation in Brazil

See also
 Gotham (disambiguation)